Computone can refer to:

 Computone, a 1970s company in Massachusetts that manufactured the lyricon, an electronic wind instrument
 Computone Corporation, an IT services company based in Scotland, renamed to Symbiat in 2002